Chatley Heath is part of 336 hectare reserve including Wisley Common, Ockham and parts of Hatchford. It is an area with a mixed habitats including heathland, ancient woodland and conifer woodland. On the top of Chatley heath (formerly known as Breach Hill) is a tower built as part of the Royal Navy Semaphore line. 

The octagonal tower was built as part of the Admiralty semaphore chain which operated between 1822 and 1847. It is the best preserved remaining tower and has a working semaphore mast. It was occupied until 1963, when it was condemned as unfit because of lack of services. It then suffered vandalism and was damaged by fire in 1984. Surrey County Council and the Surrey Historic Buildings Trust restored the tower to mark the centenary of the County Council. However the condition of tower has more recently deteriorated, and it is again undergoing restoration, this time by the Landmark Trust who are converting it into self-catering holiday accommodation. There will be public access on certain days when the restoration is complete.

Its mid-long-distance access is the first exit immediately southwest of the Wisley Interchange of the A3, after meeting the M25 there. A roundabout at the interchange enables access from the Guildford direction. Local alternative access can also be obtained via East Clandon, East Horsley or Cobham.

References 

Towers in Surrey
Parks and open spaces in Surrey
Napoleonic beacons in England